MObStor is Yahoo!'s unstructured storage cloud, similar in concept to Amazon's Simple Storage Service.

References

Cloud storage